Mukhachitram is a 2022 Indian Telugu-language legal drama directed by Gangadhar and starring Vikas Vasista, Priya Vadlamani, Ayesha Khan and Chaitanya Rao with Vishwak Sen in an extended cameo.

Cast 
Vikas Vasista as Rajkumar 
Priya Vadlamani as Mahati 
Ayesha Khan as Maya Fernandez
Chaitanya Rao as Dr. Satya
Vishwak Sen as Viswamitra (extended cameo appearance)
P. Ravishankar as Vashishta
Sunil
Harsh Roshan

Reception 
A critic from The Hindu wrote that "Mukhachitram makes a point about marital assault and the need to give the victim an empathetic hearing. If only it had been written, narrated and enacted better". A critic from 123telugu wrote that "On the whole, Mukhachitram has a relevant topic that works just in parts". Nelki Naresh Kumar for Hindustan Times rated 2.5 stars out of 5 stars and wrote "Ayesha Khan impresses with glamour. Vishvaksen guest-starred as a lawyer in the climax." Satya Pulagam for ABP News Telegu rated 2 stars of 5 stars and wrote "Chaitanya Rao's acting and dialogue delivery are good. His timing is laughable at times. Ayesha Khan stopped at the basics in acting. She still needs a lot of improvement. Ravi Shankar's voice helped with the role of a fire lawyer in acting."

References 

2020s Telugu-language films
Indian drama films
2022 drama films